Standing Rock is a census-designated place and unincorporated community in Chambers County, Alabama, United States. Its population was 132 as of the 2020 census.

Demographics

References

Census-designated places in Chambers County, Alabama
Census-designated places in Alabama